"Better Thangs" (stylized in all caps) is a song by American singer Ciara featuring Summer Walker. It was released on September 28, 2022, through Beauty Marks, Uptown and Republic.

Critical reception 
Tallie Spencer of Billboard described the song as a "feel-good, uptempo R&B anthem". Tomás Mier of Rolling Stone described the song as "sunshine-kissed". Rachel Brodsky of Stereogum described the song as "sunshiny". David Renshaw of The Fader described the song as "mood-boosting".

Promotion 
Ciara previewed a snippet of the song via TikTok on August 4, 2022. A remix for the song featuring American rapper GloRilla was released on November 4, 2022.

Charts

References 

2022 songs
Ciara songs
Summer Walker songs
Uptown Records singles
Republic Records singles
Beauty Marks Entertainment singles